Shaun Scott may refer to:

 Shaun Scott (actor)
 Shaun Scott (filmmaker)

See also
Sean Scott (disambiguation)